UEFA U-19 Championship 2008 (qualifying round) was the first round of qualifications for the final tournament of 2008 UEFA European Under-19 Championship. 52 teams are split into 13 groups of 4 and teams in each group play each other once. The top two teams in each group and the two best third-placed teams will enter UEFA U-19 Championship 2008 (Elite Round).

Group 1

Group 2

Group 3

Group 4

Group 5

Group 6

Group 7

Group 8

Group 9

Group 10

Group 11

Group 12

Group 13

Best third-placed teams

See also
2008 UEFA European Under-19 Championship
2008 UEFA European Under-19 Championship elite qualification

Qualification
UEFA European Under-19 Championship qualification